Lesja is a municipality in Innlandet county, Norway. It is located in the traditional district of Gudbrandsdal. The administrative centre of the municipality is village of Lesja. Other villages in the municipality include Bjorli, Lesjaskog, Lesjaverk, and Lora.

Lesja is located in the northwestern edge of Innlandet county. It is bordered in the north by the municipalities of Molde and Sunndal  (in Møre og Romsdal county) and Oppdal (in Trøndelag county). It is bordered to the east by the municipality of Dovre; in the south by Vågå and Lom municipalities; in the southwest by the municipality of Skjåk; and to the west by Rauma municipality.

The  municipality is the 25th largest by area out of the 356 municipalities in Norway. Lesja is the 279th most populous municipality in Norway with a population of 1,986.

General information
The parish of Lesje was established as a municipality on 1 January 1838 (see formannskapsdistrikt law). In 1863, the eastern part of the municipality (population: 2,537) was separated to become the new municipality of Dovre. This left Lesja with 3,666 residents.

Name
The municipality was named after the old Lesja farm. There are two different interpretations of the meaning of the name. It might derive from læs meaning "pasture", or it is a shortened version of "Leirsjøar" meaning "muddy lakes", referring to two relatively large and shallow lakes which occupied the valley bottom until the late 19th century, when both lakes were drained in order to gain more farmland.

Coat of arms
The coat of arms was granted on 23 January 1987. The official blazon is "Per fess argent and azure, a pile issuant from the base". This means the arms have a horizontal division line with a triangle pointing up from the line. The field (background) has a tincture of argent on the upper part which means it is colored white most of the time, but if it is made out of metal, then silver is used. The lower part has a blue color. The design is meant to represent the spire of Lesja Church, which sits on a hill and its roof line and spire are visible from far away. The arms were designed by Einar H. Skjervold.

Churches
The Church of Norway has one parish within the municipality of Lesja. It is part of the Nord-Gudbrandsdal prosti (deanery) in the Diocese of Hamar.

Geography
Lesja is highly mountainous, and lies on the east–west watershed, with the lake Lesjaskogsvatnet draining both west to the Rauma river and east to the Gudbrandsdalslågen river. The most populated areas lie between  along the Gudbrandsdalslågen river and highway E136. Abundant summer farms (seter or sæter) are situated close to the treeline, both in the main valley and its tributaries. The summer farms were of major importance for farming until recently, but today only few are used in the traditional way, and mainly as grounds for grazing dairy cattle and sheep. More than 400 lakes are situated within the municipality, mainly above treeline, including the lake Aursjøen. The landscape is hummocky in general, and owes its appearance mainly to erosion by the Scandinavian Ice Sheet during the last glacial period.

Dovrefjell-Sunndalsfjella National Park
Dovrefjell-Sunndalsfjella National Park was founded in 2002 and encompasses part of the former Dovre National Park area, as founded in 1974. It is  encompassing areas in Lesja and Dovre in Innlandet as well as areas in Trøndelag and Møre og Romsdal. It includes the Dovrefjell mountain range.

Economy
The municipality is primarily agricultural. Recent censuses show over 40% of the residents in the community are in farming.

Rail service is provided by the Rauma Line, connecting with the Dovre Line at Dombås in Dovre and extending to the terminus in Åndalsnes on the fjord in Møre og Romsdal County.

Lesja is located in a mountain region, comprising the south-westerly portion of the Dovrefjell range. It is the site of the Dovrefjell-Sunndalsfjella National Park, lies just north of Jotunheimen National Park and lies just west of Rondane National Park, so tourism and outdoor sports such as skiing are also important. The Bjorli ski area lies in Lesja.

Government
All municipalities in Norway, including Lesja, are responsible for primary education (through 10th grade), outpatient health services, senior citizen services, unemployment and other social services, zoning, economic development, and municipal roads. The municipality is governed by a municipal council of elected representatives, which in turn elects a mayor.  The municipality falls under the Østre Innlandet District Court and the Eidsivating Court of Appeal.

Municipal council
The municipal council  of Lesja is made up of 17 representatives that are elected to four year terms. The party breakdown of the council is as follows:

Mayor
The mayors of Lesja (incomplete list):

1947-1955: Ola O. Mølmen (Bp)
1956-1959: Sverre J. Botheim (Sp)
1960-1963: Ola O. Mølmen (Sp)
1964-1967: Sverre J. Botheim (Sp)
1968-1969: Ola O. Mølmen (Sp)
1970-1971: Andreas Mølmen (Heile Lesja)
1972-1975: Karl Stålaker (Sp)
1976-1987: Jo Nordahl Botheim (Sp)
1988-1991: Osvald Haugbotn (Sp)
1992-1999: Jo N. Bottheim (Sp)
1999-2011: Per Dag Hole (Sp)
2011-2015: Steinar Tronhus (Ap)
2015–present: Mariann Skotte (Sp)

History

Since it is located on a pass providing access to the Gudbrandsdalen, Lesja lies on an important trade route used in prehistoric times.

Earliest recorded history 
The area is first mentioned in the written chronicle of the Heimskringla (The Chronicle of the Kings of Norway) by Snorri Sturluson. The account of King Olaf's (A.D. 1015–1021) conversion of Dale-Gudbrand to Christianity is popularly recognized. King Olaf's success was short-lived, for in 1029 the Norwegian nobles, seething with discontent, rallied round the invading Knut the Great, and Olaf had to flee. To avoid engaging a fleet of 25 ships, 400 of King Olav's men and 100 loyal peasant farmers from Romsdal built a road up from the Romsdalfjord which passed through the area that became known as Lesjaverk. His men fled along this road and across Gudbrandsdal. There he was not warmly received since he had killed King Thorer of Gudbrandsdal, so he went on to Hedmark. From there he proceeded to Sweden and on to Russia. On his return a year later he fell at the Battle of Stiklestad.

Lesjaverk (The Lesja iron works) 

Iron smelting is recorded in Lesja municipality at Lesjaverk (Lesja Iron Works) as early as 1614, when King Christian IV of Denmark and Norway authorized the Romsdal Market at Devold on the Rauma river 4 miles upstream of Åndalsnes. With this change, Molde assumed the role as principal market town for Romsdal formerly held by Veøy. This change was made to provide the ironworkers at Lesjaverk with a convenient outlet for their products as well as providing them a market to purchases goods and food supplies such as stockfish and grain.

Art and culture 
Jakob Bersveinson Klukstad (1710 to 1773), who was born in Lom spent most of his career on Klukstad farm in Lesja. Klukstad was the foremost Norwegian sculptor and painter of his generation. His work can still be seen in churches at Lesja, Skjåk, and Heidal.

Emigration from Lesja 
The Lesja area in the Gudbrandsdal was source of numerous emigrants to America. According to Du Chaillu, "...during the great famine of 1867; a year memorable in the annals of Northern Europe, when, in consequence of an early and heavy frost in summer, the crops were destroyed, and desolation and death spread over vast districts. The lichen and the bark of the birch tree, mixed with a little flour, became the food of the people after the cattle had been eaten up and nothing else was left. The year following a strong tide of emigration set out for America."

World War 2
After the German invasion of April 1940, while King Haakon and the Norwegian government were moving from Elverum to the west coast, the King and Crown Prince Olaf arrived in Otta on the night of April 13. The prime minister and his colleagues, who were then in Lesja, were summoned and a communiqué, ending "God save Norway," and urging resistance to the unprovoked attack was issued. They now intended to relocate to the west coast, but the Germans had dropped paratroopers higher in the Gudbrandsdalen, at Dombås, cutting off the rail route. It was not until the evening of the 21st that the King was able to travel by road from Otta to Lesja on the east–west watershed and then down the narrow Romsdal to Åndalsnes.

During the war a British fighter squadron (flying 'Gloster Gladiators') flew from the icebound surface of lake Lesjaskogsvatnet. No. 263 Squadron RAF operated with 18 Gloster Gladiator biplane fighters in late April 1940 as part of the Norwegian Campaign.

Famous residents
 Jakob Klukstad (1705–1773) a wood carver and painter, lived most of his life and died in Lesja 
 Edvard Storm (1749–1794) a national romantic poet and teacher in Lesja
 Christen Pram (1756 in Lesja – 1821) an economist, civil servant, poet, novelist, playwright, diarist and magazine editor
 Jens Holmboe (1752 in Lesja – 1804)  a Norwegian bailiff, helped settle the Målselvdalen
 John Flittie (1856 in Lesja – 1913) emigrated 1867, became the first North Dakota Secretary of State
 Frederick Delius (1862-1934) summered at the house he built in 1921, Villa Høifagerli, in Lesjaskog
 Sigurd Einbu (1866 in Lesjaskog – 1946) a Norwegian self-taught astronomer  
 Ragnvald Einbu (1870 in Lesja – 1943) a painter and woodcarver of fairy-tale and genre figures
 Lars Magnus Moen (1885 in Lesja – 1964) politician and Minister, member of the Storting 1928-1957
 Olaf Heitkøtter, (Norwegian Wiki) (1928-2013) a mountain ranger in Lesja, has written seven books
 Ola Enstad (1942 in Lesjaskog – 2013) a Norwegian sculptor
 Arne Hyttnes (born 1950 in Lesjaskog) a Norwegian banker

References

Further reading

 East Norway & its Frontier by Frank Noel Stagg, 1956.
 Lesja og Dovre by Ivar Kleiven
Setrane i Lesja - i teikning og teks, ( Manors in Lesja - in drawings and text ) by Arnfinn Kjelland, 1988. 256 p. (drawings by Per Einbu).
Bygdebok for Lesja bd 1. Gards- og slektshistorie for Lesjaskogen, by Arnfin Kjelland, (Rural district for Lesja 1. Farm and genealogical history of Lesja woods) 1987. 634 p.
Bygdebok for Lesja bd 2. Gards- og slektshistorie for nørdre del av Lesja hovudsokn, by Arnfinn Kjelland, 1992. 736 p.
Bygdebok for Lesja bd 3. Gards- og slektshistorie for søre del av Lesja hovudsokn, by Arnfin Kjelland, 1996. 800 p.

External links

Municipal fact sheet from Statistics Norway 

Bjorli ski center in Lesja 
Map of Lesja from Kulturnett.no 

 
Municipalities of Innlandet
Populated places on the Gudbrandsdalslågen
1838 establishments in Norway